Thomas George Spink Suther (5 February 1814 – 23 January 1883) was the Scottish Episcopalian bishop of Aberdeen from 1857 to 1865 and first bishop of Aberdeen and Orkney from 1865 to 1883.

Suther was born in Edinburgh to Deputy Inspector General Peter Suther, M.D. was posted to Nova Scotia when his son was an infant.  His father was a doctor in the Royal Navy and was stationed at Halifax c.1814-1829. Sutherland was educated at King's College, Windsor and ordained in 1837.

At age 21, Suther moved to Scotland and became a curate in St Paul's and St George's Church for 19 years. After curacies in Edinburgh and at St. James Scottish Episcopal Church in Leith he came to St Andrew's Cathedral, Aberdeen in 1856. He died at San Remo on 23 January 1883.

In 1835, Suther married Catherine Fraser, daughter of James Fraser.

References

External links 
Lectern in memory of Suther's daughter Sarah Rachel Amelia Suther

1814 births
1883 deaths
Clergy from Edinburgh
University of King's College alumni
Provosts of St Andrew's Cathedral, Aberdeen
Bishops of Aberdeen and Orkney
Scottish Episcopalian clergy